The 2012–13 Central Arkansas Bears basketball team represented the University of Central Arkansas during the 2012–13 NCAA Division I men's basketball season. The Bears, led by third year head coach Corliss Williamson, played their home games at the Farris Center and were members of the Southland Conference. They finished the season 13–17, 7–11 in Southland play to finish in a tie for seventh place. They lost in the first round of the Southland tournament to Sam Houston State.

Roster

Schedule

|-
!colspan=9| Regular season

|-
!colspan=9| 2013 Southland Conference men's basketball tournament

References

Central Arkansas Bears basketball seasons
Central Arkansas
2012 in sports in Arkansas
2013 in sports in Arkansas